John Brown (August 12, 1772October 12, 1845) was an American mill owner and statesman from Lewistown, Pennsylvania. He represented Pennsylvania in the U.S. Congress from 1821 to 1825.

Biography

John Brown was born on August 12, 1772, near Lewistown in the Province of Pennsylvania. He attended and received his education from the common schools and moved to Lewistown in 1800. Brown became involved in the gristmill and sawmill businesses and was elected to the Pennsylvania House of Representatives, where he served from 1809 to 1813.

Brown was elected as a Republican to the United States House of Representatives for the 17th Congress in 1820. He was reelected in 1822 to the 18th Congress as a Jackson Republican. After departing the House of Representatives in 1825, Brown resumed his former business interests. He subsequently moved to Buncombe County, North Carolina in 1827, where he participated in the agriculture and real estate businesses.

Brown died in Buncombe County, North Carolina, near Skyland, on October 12, 1845. He was interred in Riverside Cemetery in Asheville, North Carolina.

External links

1772 births
1845 deaths
People from Lewistown, Pennsylvania
Democratic-Republican Party members of the United States House of Representatives from Pennsylvania
19th-century American politicians